United Nations Security Council Resolution 83, adopted on June 27, 1950, determined that the attack on the Republic of Korea by forces from North Korea constituted a breach of the peace.  The Council called for an immediate cessation of hostilities and for the authorities in North Korea to withdraw their armed forces to the 38th parallel.  They also noted the report by the United Nations Commission on Korea that stated North Korea's failure to comply with Security Council Resolution 82 and that urgent military measures were required to restore international peace and security.

The Council then recommended that "Members of the United Nations furnish such assistance to the Republic of Korea as may be necessary to repel the armed attack and to restore international peace and security in the area."

The resolution was adopted by seven votes to one against from Yugoslavia. Egypt and India were present but did not participate in voting. The Soviet Union did not veto the resolution because it had been boycotting the Security Council since January 1950, in protest of China's seat at the UN being held by the Republic of China and not the People's Republic of China.

See also
Korean War
United Nations Command
List of United Nations Security Council Resolutions 1 to 100 (1946–1953)

References

External links
 
Text of the Resolution at undocs.org

 0083
Korean War
 0083
 0083
1950 in South Korea
1950 in Korea
1950 in North Korea
June 1950 events